The men's keirin competition at the 2014 Asian Games was held on 25 September 2014 at the Incheon International Velodrome.

Schedule
All times are Korea Standard Time (UTC+09:00)

Results
Legend
DNF — Did not finish
DNS — Did not start
REL — Relegated

First round

Heat 1

Heat 2

Heat 3

First round repechages

Heat 1

Heat 2

Second round

Heat 1

Heat 2

Finals

Final 7–12

Final 1–6

Final standing

References 
Results

External links 
 

Track Men keirin